Frederick George Room VC (31 May 1895 – 19 January 1932) was an English recipient of the Victoria Cross, the highest and most prestigious award for gallantry in the face of the enemy that can be awarded to British and Commonwealth forces.

Early life 
Frederick George Room was born in the Horfield suburb of Bristol, England.

Victoria Cross
He was 22 years old, and an acting lance-corporal in the 2nd Battalion, The Royal Irish Regiment, British Army during the First World War when the following deed took place for which he was awarded the VC.

His Victoria Cross is displayed at the National Army Museum in Chelsea, London, England.

Death 
Room died at a hospital in Bristol on 19 January 1932, aged 36, following a long period of illness. He is buried at Greenbank Cemetery in Bristol.

References

Monuments to Courage (David Harvey, 1999)
The Register of the Victoria Cross (This England, 1997)
VCs of the First World War - Passchendaele 1917 (Stephen Snelling, 1998)

External links
Location of grave and VC medal (Avon)

1895 births
1932 deaths
Military personnel from Bristol
Royal Irish Regiment (1684–1922) soldiers
British Army personnel of World War I
British World War I recipients of the Victoria Cross
British Army recipients of the Victoria Cross